Taygete sphecophila is a moth in the family Autostichidae. It was described by Edward Meyrick in 1936. It is found in Trinidad.

References

Moths described in 1936
Taygete (moth)